Mountain View is a small community located in Prince Edward County, Ontario located south of Belleville. Mountain View is the location of a former British Commonwealth Air Training Plan air station which is now known as Canadian Forces Detachment Mountain View (CFD Mountain View), a detachment of CFB Trenton.

See also
CFD Mountain View
Trenton/Mountain View Airport

Communities in Prince Edward County, Ontario